Charles Montague Bakewell (April 24, 1867 – September 19, 1957) was a university professor and Republican politician who served in the United States House of Representatives.

Early life
Bakewell was born in Pittsburgh on April 24, 1867.  He attended the schools of Pittsburgh and the University of Pittsburgh before graduating from the University of California at Berkeley in 1889.  He received a master's degree from the University of California in 1891, and his PhD from Harvard University in 1894.  From 1894 to 1896, Bakewell attended the Universities of Berlin, Strasbourg, and Paris.

Academic career
Bakewell was a philosophy instructor at Harvard University from 1896 to 1897, and the University of California from 1897 to 1898.  From 1898 to 1900, Bakewell was an associate professor at Bryn Mawr College, and he was an associate professor and then professor at the University of California from 1900 to 1905.  From 1905 to 1933, Bakewell was a professor at Yale University 1905–1933.  In 1910, he served as president of the American Philosophical Association.

World War I
During World War I, Bakewell served under the Italian Commission of the American Red Cross in Italy, holding the ranks of major and deputy commissioner while performing duties as an inspector and historian.

Political career
After the war, Bakewell was elected to the Connecticut State Senate as a Republican, and he served from 1920 to 1924.  From 1921 to 1923, he served as chairman of the state commission that revised and codified Connecticut's educational laws.

In 1932, Bakewell was elected to the United States House of Representatives, and he served one term, March 4, 1933, to January 3, 1935.  He was an unsuccessful candidate for reelection in 1934.  In 1936, he was a delegate to the Republican national Convention.

Death and burial
Bakewell died in New Haven, Connecticut on September 19, 1957, and was buried at Grove Street Cemetery in New Haven.

References

External links

Charles Montague Bakewell at The Political Graveyard
 
 

1867 births
1957 deaths
Burials at Grove Street Cemetery
Republican Party Connecticut state senators
University of California, Berkeley alumni
Harvard University alumni
Republican Party members of the United States House of Representatives from Connecticut
University of Pittsburgh alumni
20th-century American politicians